Thomas McNamara (1872 - 5 October 1944) was an Irish Gaelic footballer. His championship career with the Limerick senior team lasted three seasons from 1887 until 1889.

McNamara made his inter-county debut during the 1887 championship when the Commercials club represented Limerick in the inaugural championship. He won his sole All-Ireland medal that year as Limerick defeated Louth in the final.

Honours

Limerick
All-Ireland Senior Football Championship (1): 1887

References

1872 births
1944 deaths
Commercials (Limerick) Gaelic footballers
Limerick inter-county Gaelic footballers